Graeme George Burns (born 29 October 1971) is a Scottish rugby union coach and former player. He gained four international caps for the Scotland national rugby union team and captained the Scotland A team and Scotland 7s team. He began playing rugby in the amateur era, then went on to captain Edinburgh Rugby as a professional.

Early life
Burns was born on 29 October 1971 in Edinburgh, Scotland. He was educated at Daniel Stewart's and Melville College. In 1990 he played for under-18 side while at Stewart's Melville RFC.

Burns captain Scotland at the 1997 Rugby World Cup Sevens.

His first cap for the Scotland XV came against Italy in a Five Nations at Murrayfield on 6 March 1999. His final appearance for Scotland was on tour against the United States of America at San Francisco on 22 June 2002. He was a replacement in all four of his international caps.

In 2001 he captained the Scotland A side.

He played his last match for Edinburgh in May 2004 before he was released by the side.

He was a coach at Haddington RFC, leaving the post in 2009.

References

External links
 

1971 births
Living people
Rugby union players from Edinburgh
Rugby union scrum-halves
People educated at Stewart's Melville College
Scottish rugby union coaches
Scottish rugby union players
Scotland international rugby union players
Stewart's Melville RFC players
Scotland international rugby sevens players
Scotland 'A' international rugby union players
Male rugby sevens players